Charles Bana (born 9 September 1956) is a Cameroonian former cyclist. He competed in the team time trial event at the 1980 Summer Olympics.

References

External links
 

1956 births
Living people
Cameroonian male cyclists
Olympic cyclists of Cameroon
Cyclists at the 1980 Summer Olympics
Place of birth missing (living people)